"Back in the Day" is the third and final single released from Illegal's debut album, The Untold Truth. It was written by members Jamal and Malik, each detailing their hardships growing up before they received a record deal. The song peaked at 80 on the Hot R&B/Hip-Hop Singles & Tracks and 21 on the Hot Rap Singles and was the last release from Illegal. The song was produced by Colin Wolfe.

Single track listing

A-Side
"Back in the Day" (Rowdy Main Mix)- 5:05  
"Back in the Day" (Radio Edit)- 4:15  
"Back in the Day" (Accapella Mix)- 4:59  
"Back in the Day" (Percapella Mix)- 5:02

B-Side
"Back in the Day" (Album Version)- 5:10  
"Back in the Day" (Extended Instrumental)- 3:20  
"Stick 'Em Up"- 4:22

References

1994 singles
1993 songs
Illegal (group) songs
Rowdy Records singles
Songs written by Jamal (rapper)